Vidia Arredondo Barra (1920 – April 24, 2015), better known by her pseudonym Claudia Paz, was a Chilean actress.

She studied at the University of Chile and participated in the Experimental Theater. Since 1980, she frequently appeared in commercials and soap operas.

Filmography

Films
 El tango del viudo (1967)
 ya no basta con rezar (1973)
 Hasta en las mejores familias (1994)
 La virtud de la familia (2013)

Television
 La Madrastra (1981)
 Bienvenido Hermano Andes (1982)
 Marta a las Ocho (1985)
 Morir de amor (1985)
 Bellas y audaces (1988)
 Semidiós (1988)
 La intrusa (1989)
 Villa Nápoli (1991)
 Sucupira (1996)
 Eclipse de luna (1997)
 El día menos pensado (2006)
 El diario secreto de una profesional (2012)

References

External links
 

1920 births
Chilean actresses
20th-century Chilean actresses
21st-century Chilean actresses
Actresses from Santiago
2015 deaths